Heen naran (Citrus crenatifolia), is a tangerine native to Sri Lanka, having very small, moderately oblate to obconical, deep orange fruit with a thin, moderately loose rind. The flesh is somewhat coarse-grained, dry, and acidic, but becomes edible at full maturity.

Taxonomy
The name and status of the species is unresolved. Tanaka suggested that it may be conspecific with C. lycopersicaeformis, the 'Kokni' or 'Monkey mandarin' found in southern India.

References

External links
https://www.flickr.com/photos/fazalyehiya/6411327783/
http://www.theplantlist.org/tpl/record/kew-2724061
http://tropicos.info/Name/50270452

Crenatifolia
Flora of Sri Lanka